Rhesus (Ancient Greek: Ῥῆσος Rhêsos) is a mythical Thracian king in Iliad, Book X, who fought on the side of Trojans. Diomedes and Odysseus stole his team of fine horses during a night raid on the Trojan camp.

Etymology 
His name (a Thracian anthroponym) probably derives from PIE *reg-, 'to rule', showing a satem-sound change.

Family
According to Homer, his father was Eioneus who may be connected to the historic Eion in western Thrace, at the mouth of the Strymon, and the port of the later Amphipolis. Later writers provide Rhesus with a more exotic parentage, claiming that his mother was one of the Muses (Euterpe, Calliope or Terpsichore) and his father, the river god Strymon. Stephanus of Byzantium mentions the name of Rhesus' sister Sete, who had a son Bithys with Ares. In one account, Rhesus' brothers are called Olynthus and Brangas.

Mythology 

Rhesus was raised by fountain nymphs and died without engaging in battle. He arrived late to Troy, because his country was attacked by Scythia, right after he received word that the Greeks had attacked Troy. Dolon, who had gone out to spy on Agamemnon’s army for Hector, was caught by Diomedes and Odysseus and proceeded to tell the two Argives about the newest arrivals, Thracians under the leadership of Rhesus. Dolon explained that Rhesus had the finest horses, as well as huge, golden armor that was suitable for gods rather than mortals. Because of Dolon’s cowardice, Rhesus met his demise without ever getting the chance to defend himself or Troy. When the Thracians were sleeping, Diomedes and Odysseus attacked the camp in the dead of night, killing Rhesus in his tent and stealing his famous steeds. 

The event portrayed in the Iliad  also provides the action of the play Rhesus, transmitted among the plays of Euripides. The mother of Rhesus, one of the nine muses, then arrived and laid blame on all those responsible: Odysseus, Diomedes, and Athena. She also announced the imminent resurrection of Rhesus, who will become immortal but will be sent to stay in a cave. Scholia to the Iliad episode and the Rhesus agree in giving Rhesus a more heroic stature, incompatible with Homer's version.

Rhesus is also named as one of the eight rivers that Poseidon raged from Mount Ida to the sea in order to knock down the wall that the Achaeans built.

There was also a river in Bithynia named Rhesus, with Greek myth providing an attendant river god of the same name. Rhesus the Thracian king was himself associated with Bithynia through his love with the Bithynian huntress Arganthone, in the Erotika Pathemata ["Sufferings for Love"] by Parthenius of Nicaea, chapter 36.

Namesake
 Rhesus Glacier on Anvers Island in Antarctica is named after Rhesus of Thrace, as is the Jovian asteroid 9142 Rhesus.

Cultural depictions
In the motion picture Hercules, Tobias Santelmann plays a character named Rhesus, who lives in the vicinity of Thrace but has little else in common with the traditional character, instead being a rebel against King Cotys.

In the videogame Total War Saga: Troy, Rhesus becomes a playable character along with Memnon. His campaign involves him unifying the Thracian tribes.

Notes

References 

 Apollodorus, The Library with an English Translation by Sir James George Frazer, F.B.A., F.R.S. in 2 Volumes, Cambridge, MA, Harvard University Press; London, William Heinemann Ltd. 1921. ISBN 0-674-99135-4. Online version at the Perseus Digital Library. Greek text available from the same website.
Conon, Fifty Narrations, surviving as one-paragraph summaries in the Bibliotheca (Library) of Photius, Patriarch of Constantinople translated from the Greek by Brady Kiesling. Online version at the Topos Text Project.
Euripides, The Rhesus of Euripides translated into English rhyming verse with explanatory notes by Gilbert Murray, LL.D., D.Litt, F.B.A., Regius Professor of Greek in the University of Oxford. Euripides. Gilbert Murray. New York. Oxford University Press. 1913. Online version at the Perseus Digital Library.
Euripides, Euripidis Fabulae. vol. 3. Gilbert Murray. Oxford. Clarendon Press, Oxford. 1913. Greek text available at the Perseus Digital Library.
Homer, The Iliad with an English Translation by A.T. Murray, Ph.D. in two volumes. Cambridge, MA., Harvard University Press; London, William Heinemann, Ltd. 1924. . Online version at the Perseus Digital Library.
 Homer, Homeri Opera in five volumes. Oxford, Oxford University Press. 1920. . Greek text available at the Perseus Digital Library.
 Maurus Servius Honoratus, In Vergilii carmina comentarii. Servii Grammatici qui feruntur in Vergilii carmina commentarii; recensuerunt Georgius Thilo et Hermannus Hagen. Georgius Thilo. Leipzig. B. G. Teubner. 1881. Online version at the Perseus Digital Library.
Stephanus of Byzantium, Stephani Byzantii Ethnicorum quae supersunt, edited by August Meineike (1790-1870), published 1849. A few entries from this important ancient handbook of place names have been translated by Brady Kiesling. Online version at the Topos Text Project.

External links

Children of Potamoi
Demigods in classical mythology
Mythological kings of Thrace
Kings in Greek mythology
People of the Trojan War
Thracian characters in Greek mythology
Greek mythology of Thrace